Candy Girl: A Year in the Life of an Unlikely Stripper is a memoir written by Diablo Cody, who later became known as an Academy Award–winning screenwriter. It focused on Cody's brief career working as a stripper and the various sights and oddities that she encountered.

Development
Candy Girl began after Mason Novick, who would soon become Cody's manager, showed interest in Cody's acerbic wit after reading about her adventures in her blog titled Pussy Ranch. Based on the popularity the blog had received, he was able to secure her a publishing contract with Gotham Books.

References

2005 non-fiction books
American memoirs
Erotic dance
Works by Diablo Cody
Gotham Books books